The gilded catfish or jau (Zungaro zungaro) is a South American catfish (order Siluriformes) of the family Pimelodidae. It is also known as manguruyu or black manguruyu.

Taxonomy
By some sources, it is the only species of the monotypic genus Zungaro. However, some sources list other species as valid, such as Zungaro jahu. This species may be referred to by one of its synonyms, Brachyplatystoma flavicans. This species contains two subspecies, Z. z. mangurus and Z. z. zungaro.

Distribution and habitat
They are sexually mature upon reaching  weight. This fish native to the Orinoco and Amazon basins; in the Amazon, this fish is found quite upstream, in the main bed of the big tributaries with muddy bottoms.

Description
These fish are mainly piscivorous, hunt at night, and sometimes go into flood-prone areas of rivers. Some migrations in pursuit of migrating Triportheus and Anodus have been reported. The nursery ground is at the mouths of rivers.

References

External links
DOURADA
Dourada 02
The Gilded Catfish

Pimelodidae
Catfish of South America
Catfish
Catfish
Catfish
Catfish
Magdalena River
Catfish
Fish of French Guiana
Catfish
Fish of Paraguay
Catfish
Fish of Suriname
Fish of Uruguay
Catfish
Catfish
Fish described in 1821
Taxa named by Alexander von Humboldt